
Kędzierzyn-Koźle County is a unit of territorial administration and local government (powiat) in Opole Voivodeship, south-western Poland. It came into being on January 1, 1999, as a result of the Polish local government reforms passed in 1998.

As of 2019 its total population is 94,135, out of which the population of Kędzierzyn-Koźle is 60,852 and the rural population is 33,283.

Neighbouring counties
Kędzierzyn-Koźle County is bordered by Strzelce County to the north, Gliwice County to the east, Racibórz County to the south, Głubczyce County and Prudnik County to the west, and Krapkowice County to the north-west.

Administrative division
The county is subdivided into six gminas (one urban and five rural). These are listed in the following table, in descending order of population.

References

 
Land counties of Opole Voivodeship